Paranormal Attack is a psychedelic trance group formed by Rui Oliveira (Xangaii), Gonçalo Miranda and Lucas, originally from Portugal. They have been producing psy-trance since 2001.

Discography 
Albums:
 Phenomenon (2006)
 Walking in the Sun (2007) (unofficial album made by the fans over the Internet)
 Phenomenon (Deluxe Edition) (2013)

EPs:
My Beats Gonna Rock You - Wired Music 2012
Secret Weapons ( vs Skazi ) - Wired Music 2012
Soldiers - Global Army Music 2014
Cobra Gypsies - Fxxk Tomorrow 2016

Singles:
"Dancehall Style" - Wired Music 2013
"S.O.M.H." - Fxxk Tomorrow 2015
"Thousand Ways" (feat. Nick London) - Fxxk Tomorrow 2015

Remixes:
Skazi and Ami - Never Again (Paranormal Attack Rmx) - The Gathering Dvd - Vision Quest 2008
Sesto Sento - Louder (Paranormal Attack Rmx) - Planet Ben Records 2012
Karetus - Battle Royale (Paranormal Attack Rmx) - Global Army Music 2014

Compilation tracks and collaborations:
"Bionik Pulse" - Awakening Soul - Crystal Matrix Records 2003
"What Have You Done" (Rmx) - Digital Eyes - Third Eye Records India 2003
"Viranchi the Creator" - Al Part 2 - Shiva Space Japan 2004
"Mastula" ( vs Xp-Voodoo & Paul Taylor ) - Hi-Tech Pleasures - Crystal Matrix Records 2004
"Yakuza" - Zoo 3 - Chemical Crew Records 2004
"The Bitts" ( vs Skazi ) - Zoo 3 - Chemical Crew Records 2004
"What Have You Done?" - Sirius - Sirius Records 2004
"The Chemical Mafia" - Chemical Crew Records 2004
"Go On" - Transparent Image - Sirius Records 2005
"Babbas Fritos" ( vs 40% ) - Transparent Image - Sirius Records 2005
"Different Song" - Raveolution - Chemical Crew Records 2005
"Psycrepes" ( vs Exaile ) - Chemical Playground - Chemical Crew Records 2006
"Fucking My Brain" ( vs Skazi ) - Skazi Album "Total Anarchy" - Chemical Crew Records 2006
"Brazil" - Turbulence - Chemical Crew Records 2006
"Everything But The Beats" - Xxxperience 10 Years - LK2 Music 2007
"Vão Fazer De Novo" ( with Charlie Brown Jr ) - Ritmo, Ritual e Responsa - EMI Brazil 2007
"Going Down" - Psychedelic High 2 - Chemical Crew Records 2007
"Tell Me Why" ( vs Mush ) - Mush-A-Holic - Wired Music 2007
"Come Along" - Be Your Self - Wired Music 2011
"Get Away" ( vs Cosmonet ) - Out of the Blue - FinePlay Records 2014

Musical groups established in 2001
Psychedelic trance musical groups
Portuguese electronic music groups